Leon Hart (born April 27, 1951) is an American football coach. Hart served the head football coach at Elon University in Elon, North Carolina for seven seasons, from 1989 to 1995, compiling a record of 37–37. Before he was hired by Elon in January 1989, Hart worked as an assistant coach at Eastern Kentucky University for 13 seasons, the final eight as offensive coordinator. He was a member of two NCAA Division I-AA Football Championship-winning teams at Eastern Kentucky led by head coach Roy Kidd, in 1979 and 1982.

Head coaching record

References

1951 births
Living people
Eastern Kentucky Colonels football coaches
Elon Phoenix football coaches